Germiston is a neighbourhood in the city of Glasgow, Scotland, north of the River Clyde.

History
It formerly centred around Germiston House, a mansion built in 1690 by Robert Dinwiddie, a tobacco lord in Virginia and father of Robert Dinwiddie, governor of Virginia, and Lawrence Dinwiddie, Lord Provost of Glasgow, both of whom were born there.

Lawrence Dinwiddie inherited the house and raised his 21 children there.

In 1864, the house was acquired by Rev Dr George Stewart Burns, minister of Glasgow Cathedral. The setting of the house was ruined by a railway line being placed beside it and it was used as housing for labourers from around 1890.

The area forms part of the suburb of Springburn for political purposes, but is more commonly referred to as part of the 'Royston Road corridor' flanked by the Cumbernauld Line railway and the M8 motorway (previously the Monkland Canal), its location midway between Blackhill to its east and Royston (Garngad) to its west earning it a position as the 'wee sister' of both of those better-known neighbourhoods. In the early 21st century, construction of private housing injected some new investment into what was a decaying area, with most residents surviving on low incomes following the collapse of local heavy industries and most of the housing stock dating from the 1930s; combined with new developments on the old railway yards on Royston Road, this has done much to breathe new life into the area.

During Glasgow's growth during the Industrial Revolution, Germiston was a vital part of the city's locomotive manufacturing industry as well as sitting upon a major railway junction. Germiston Works, one of such locomotive factories was sold onto the Cape Asbestos Company, who used it to manufacture fireproof insulation materials. The plant still exists to this day, under the ownership of Promat, and now uses the safer Calcium Silicate for such material.

A narrow gauge underground railway used to exist at Germiston, but most of the path it once took has now been filled in to develop the land for house building. Its tunnel, known locally as the "Blind Tunnel", now carries a single-track road from Darnick Street Tunnel to Royston Road and Forge Street, and is controlled by traffic lights with lighting for pedestrians. It is often confused with an adjacent tunnel, which has now been blocked completely by metal fencing to prevent unauthorised access to the local Provan Gas Works. The underground railway from Germiston transported coke to Provan Gas Works for the manufacture of natural gas.

Barmulloch Primary is affiliated to Springburn Academy, but other local children who attend Royston Primary School would attend Smithycroft Secondary School in Riddrie, as do those from Wallacewell Primary which serves North Balornock and Robroyston further north of Barmulloch, although Riddrie is geographically closer to Germiston than Robroyston, North Balornock or Royston. Local Catholic pupils have a different issue, with those who attend St Roch's Primary transferring to the secondary school of the same name, but those going to St Philomena's Primary expected to move to All Saints Secondary in Barmulloch.

See also
Glasgow tower blocks

References

External links
Germiston Then and Now
Royston Road Project

Areas of Glasgow
Springburn